New Territories West Cluster is one of the seven hospital clusters managed by Hospital Authority in Hong Kong. It consists of four public hospitals and eight general outpatient clinics to provide public healthcare services for the population of Tuen Mun and Yuen Long districts. In mid-2012, the population was 1,085,300. The current Cluster Chief Executive is Dr Simon Tang.

Services
New Territories West Cluster operates the following four hospitals of various capabilities to provide a range of acute, convalescent, rehabilitation, and infirmary inpatient and ambulatory care services to the public in the areas of Tuen Mun and Yuen Long districts. In mid-2012, the population of the areas was 1,085,300.
Tin Shui Wai Hospital
Castle Peak Hospital
Pok Oi Hospital
Siu Lam Hospital
Tuen Mun Hospital
, the cluster has 3,967 in-patient beds.

References

External links

Hospital Authority